The 2017–18 QMJHL season was the 49th season of the Quebec Major Junior Hockey League (QMJHL). The regular season began on September 21, 2017, and ended on March 18, 2018.

The playoffs started March 22, 2018, and ended on May 13. The winning team, the Acadie–Bathurst Titan, were awarded the President's Cup and won the Memorial Cup as the QMJHL champion in the 2018 Memorial Cup, which was hosted by the Regina Pats of the WHL at the Brandt Centre in Regina, Saskatchewan from May 18–27, 2018.

Regular season standings

Note: GP = Games played; W = Wins; L = Losses; OTL = Overtime losses; SL = Shootout losses; GF = Goals for; GA = Goals against; PTS = Points; x = clinched playoff berth; y = clinched division title; z = clinched Jean Rougeau Trophy

Scoring leaders
Note: GP = Games played; G = Goals; A = Assists; Pts = Points; PIM = Penalty minutes

Leading goaltenders
Note: GP = Games played; Mins = Minutes played; W = Wins; L = Losses: OTL = Overtime losses; SL = Shootout losses; GA = Goals Allowed; SO = Shutouts; GAA = Goals against average

2018 President's Cup playoffs

First round

(1) Blainville-Boisbriand Armada vs. (16) Val-d'Or Foreurs

(2) Acadie–Bathurst Titan vs. (15) Chicoutimi Saguenéens

(3) Rimouski Océanic vs. (14) Moncton Wildcats

(4) Halifax Mooseheads vs. (13) Baie-Comeau Drakkar

(5) Drummondville Voltigeurs vs. (12) Cape Breton Screaming Eagles

(6) Victoriaville Tigres vs. (11) Gatineau Olympiques

(7) Rouyn-Noranda Huskies vs. (10) Sherbrooke Phoenix

(8) Quebec Remparts vs. (9) Charlottetown Islanders

Quarter-finals

(1) Blainville-Boisbriand Armada vs. (14) Moncton Wildcats

(2) Acadie–Bathurst Titan vs. (10) Sherbrooke Phoenix

(4) Halifax Mooseheads vs. (9) Charlottetown Islanders

(5) Drummondville Voltigeurs vs. (6) Victoriaville Tigres

Semi-finals

(1) Blainville-Boisbriand Armada vs. (9) Charlottetown Islanders

(2) Acadie–Bathurst Titan vs. (6) Victoriaville Tigres

President's Cup Finals

(1) Blainville-Boisbriand Armada vs. (2) Acadie–Bathurst Titan

Playoff leading scorers
Note: GP = Games played; G = Goals; A = Assists; Pts = Points; PIM = Penalty minutes

Playoff leading goaltenders

Note: GP = Games played; Mins = Minutes played; W = Wins; L = Losses: OTL = Overtime losses; SL = Shootout losses; GA = Goals Allowed; SO = Shutouts; GAA = Goals against average

Trophies and awards
President's Cup – Playoff Champions: Acadie–Bathurst Titan
Jean Rougeau Trophy – Regular Season Champions: Blainville-Boisbriand Armada
Luc Robitaille Trophy – Team with the best goals for average: Drummondville Voltigeurs
Robert Lebel Trophy – Team with best GAA: Rimouski Océanic

Player
Michel Brière Memorial Trophy – Most Valuable Player: Alex Barre-Boulet, Blainville-Boisbriand Armada
Jean Béliveau Trophy – Top Scorer: Alex Barre-Boulet, Blainville-Boisbriand Armada
Guy Lafleur Trophy – Playoff MVP: Jeffrey Truchon-Viel, Acadie–Bathurst Titan
Jacques Plante Memorial Trophy – Top Goaltender: Samuel Harvey, Rouyn-Noranda Huskies
Guy Carbonneau Trophy – Best Defensive Forward: Samuel Dove-McFalls, Rimouski Océanic
Emile Bouchard Trophy – Defenceman of the Year: Olivier Galipeau, Acadie–Bathurst Titan
Kevin Lowe Trophy – Best Defensive Defenceman: Tobbie Paquette-Bisson, Blainville-Boisbriand Armada
Michael Bossy Trophy – Top Prospect: Filip Zadina, Halifax Mooseheads
RDS Cup – Rookie of the Year: Alexis Lafrenière, Rimouski Océanic
Michel Bergeron Trophy – Offensive Rookie of the Year: Alexis Lafrenière, Rimouski Océanic
Raymond Lagacé Trophy – Defensive Rookie of the Year: Colten Ellis – Rimouski Océanic
Frank J. Selke Memorial Trophy – Most sportsmanlike player: Joël Teasdale, Blainville-Boisbriand Armada
QMJHL Humanitarian of the Year – Humanitarian of the Year: Vincent Tremblay-Lapalme, Chicoutimi Saguenéens
Marcel Robert Trophy – Best Scholastic Player: Alexandre Alain, Blainville-Boisbriand Armada
Paul Dumont Trophy – Personality of the Year: Dominique Ducharme, Drummondville Voltigeurs

Executive
Ron Lapointe Trophy – Coach of the Year: Joël Bouchard, Blainville-Boisbriand Armada
Maurice Filion Trophy – General Manager of the Year: Serge Beausoleil, Rimouski Océanic

All-Star Teams 
First All-Star Team:
 Samuel Harvey, Goaltender, Rouyn-Noranda Huskies
 Noah Dobson, Defenceman, Acadie–Bathurst Titan
 Olivier Galipeau, Defenceman, Acadie–Bathurst Titan
 Alexis Lafrenière, Left Wing, Rimouski Océanic
 Alex Barre-Boulet, Centre, Blainville-Boisbriand Armada
 Filip Zadina, Right Wing, Halifax Mooseheads

Second All-Star Team:
 Colten Ellis, Goaltender, Rimouski Océanic
 Nicolas Beaudin, Defenceman, Drummondville Voltigeurs
 Charle-Édouard D'Astous, Defenceman, Rimouski Océanic
 Max Comtois, Left Wing, Victoriaville Tigres
 Vitalii Abramov, Centre, Victoriaville Tigres
 Alexandre Alain, Right Wing, Blainville-Boisbriand Armada

All-Rookie Team:
 Colten Ellis, Goaltender, Rimouski Océanic
 Justin Barron, Defenceman, Halifax Mooseheads
 Radim Salda, Defenceman, Saint John Sea Dogs
 Alexis Lafrenière, Left Wing, Rimouski Océanic
 Jakob Pelletier, Centre, Moncton Wildcats
 Filip Zadina, Right Wing, Halifax Mooseheads

See also
 List of QMJHL seasons
 2017 in ice hockey
 2018 in ice hockey
 2017–18 OHL season
 2017–18 WHL season
 2018 Memorial Cup

References

External links
 Official QMJHL website
 Official CHL website
 Official website of the Subway Super Series

Quebec Major Junior Hockey League seasons
Qmjhl